Raymond Dominic Sinatra (November 1, 1904 – November 1980) was an Italian-born American conductor, best known as the music director of Mario Lanza.

Life

Ray Sinatra was born in Agrigento, Sicily, Italy, in 1904.
He was a second cousin of Frank Sinatra.
He received an extensive musical education under many artists.
He became a conductor, bandleader and arranger.
In 1935 he was working in Boston as a radio band leader.
In 1936 he was conductor of Lucky Strike's Your Hit Parade.
Frank Sinatra contacted Ray in the Spring of 1937 while he was working in the NBC house orchestra, asked whether they were related, and mentioned that he wanted to become a singer. Ray checked and found they were cousins, and helped find a stint for Frank on an NBC radio show.
Frank wanted to change his name to "Frankie Trent". Ray dissuaded him, saying "Are you kiddin'? 'Sinatra's the most beautiful name in the world – it's so musical."
Ray became well known as a conductor. 
Early in Frank Sinatra's career, when he was leading the instrumental jazz combo The Four Sharps, he was asked by Fred Allen whether he was related to Ray Sinatra.
Not long after, Ray was being asked if he was related to Frank.
 

Ray Sinatra conducted popular music competently, although he tended to use over-elaborate arrangements, and his orchestra sometimes sounded more like a big band.
He was a modest success in the swing era.
He worked well with Mario Lanza in two recording sessions at Republic Studios in Hollywood, including a famous version of Granada.
Ray Sinatra conducted Mario Lanza's 1950 Be My Love, the singer's first single to sell a million copies.
Sinatra would conduct many of Lanza's future non-operatic recording and radio show songs.
Ray Sinatra was bandleader for Lanza on an NBC radio show in 1951 that pushed Lanza's expected earnings up to $750,000 for the year.
In 1954, Sinatra led the orchestra for the Ziegfeld Follies at Sands Hotel and Casino, Las Vegas, with choreographer Bob Gilbert.
For many years he was bandleader at the Tropicana Las Vegas.

His son Richard (1935-1979) became a character actor who appeared in both television and film during the 1960s.

Selected recordings

Mario Lanza With Ray Sinatra And His Orchestra – Granada / Lolita 2 versions RCA Victor Red Seal 1949		
Mario Lanza With Ray Sinatra And His Orchestra – Siboney / Valencia (7", Single) RCA Victor	
Mario Lanza Con Orquesta Dirigida Por Ray Sinatra – La Caricia De Tu Mano (7", EP) RCA 1957		
Mario Lanza Con Orquesta Dirigida Por Ray Sinatra – Granada (7", EP) RCA 1958		
Mario Lanza, Jeff Alexander Choir, Ray Sinatra – O Come All Ye Faithful (7", EP) His Master's Voice

Notes

Sources

External sources

1904 births
1980 deaths
American male conductors (music)
People from Agrigento
Italian emigrants to the United States
20th-century American conductors (music)
20th-century American male musicians
Musicians from the Province of Agrigento